Streptococcus uberis is a species of Streptococcus.

References

Further reading

External links
 Type strain of Streptococcus uberis at BacDive -  the Bacterial Diversity Metadatabase

Streptococcaceae
Gram-positive bacteria